The Roman Catholic Diocese of Basse-Terre and Pointe-à-Pitre, more simply known as the Diocese of Basse-Terre, is a diocese of the Latin Church of the Roman Catholic Church in the Caribbean.
 
The diocese comprises the entirety of the French overseas department of Guadeloupe, one of the Leeward Lesser Antilles. It is also responsible for parishes in the small overseas departments of Saint Barthélemy and Saint Martin. The diocese is a suffragan of the Metropolitan Archdiocese of Fort-de-France, and both are members of the Antilles Episcopal Conference.

History 
It was erected in 1850, as the Diocese of Guadeloupe and Basse-Terre, on territory split off from the then Apostolic Prefecture of Îles de la Terre Ferme (an Antillian missionary jurisdiction, which was promoted to diocese of Martinique and meanwhile became the Roman Catholic Archdiocese of Fort-de-France), its present Metropolitan.

The bishopric was renamed in 1951 to the present name, Diocese of Basse-Terre. 
Also on 19 July 1951, it was united with the thus suppressed diocese of Pointe-à-Pitre (on Grande Terre, which still has its former cathedral of St. Peter and Paul), so its incumbents' (rarely used) full title is bishop of Basse-Terre-Pointe-à-Pitre.

Bishops
All Latin (Roman Rite). Most bishops were secular; a few belonged to specified religious congregations.

Incumbent ordinaries
Bishops of Guadeloupe and Basse-Terre
Pierre-Marie-Gervais Lacarrière (1850–1853)
Théodore-Augustin Forcade, Paris Foreign Missions Society (M.E.P.) (1853–1861), appointed Bishop of Nevers
Antoine Boutonnet (1862–1868)
Joseph-Clair Reyne (1869–1872)
François-Benjamin-Joseph Blanger (1873–1883), appointed Bishop of Limoges
Fédéric-Henri Oury (1884–1886), appointed Bishop of Fréjus
Pierre-Marie Avon (1899–1901)
Emmanuel-François Canappe (1901–1907)
Pierre-Louis Genoud, Holy Ghost Fathers (C.S.Sp.) (1912–1945)
Jean Gay, C.S.Sp. (1945–see below)

Bishops of Basse-Terre(-Pointe-à-Pitre)
Jean Gay, C.S.Sp. (as above–1968)
Siméon Oualli (1970–1984)
Ernest Mesmin Lucien Cabo (1984–2008)
Jean-Yves Riocreux (2012–2021)

Coadjutor bishop
Jean Gay, C.S.Sp. (1943–1945)

Auxiliary bishop
Ernest Mesmin Lucien Cabo (1983–1984), appointed bishop here

See also 

 Church of Our Lady of the Assumption, Lorient

Sources and external links 
 Diocèse de Guadeloupe  official site 
 GigaCatholic, with incumbent biographies
 

Catholic Church in Guadeloupe
Basse-Terre
Diocese of Baseeterre-Pointeapitre
Basse-Terre
Basse-Terre
1850 establishments in Guadeloupe
Roman Catholic Ecclesiastical Province of Fort-de-France